Pirmane is a small settlement east of Begunje in the Municipality of Cerknica in the Inner Carniola region of Slovenia.

References

External links

Pirmane on Geopedia

Populated places in the Municipality of Cerknica